Manav Bharti University is a private university located in the village Laddo near Kumarhatti in Solan district in the Indian state of Himachal Pradesh. Despite claiming to be established under the Himachal Pradesh State Legislature Act and notified under Section 2(f) of the University Grants Commission Act of 1956, as of February 2020 the institution has been rocked by multiple criticism over its issuance of degrees.

Degree controversy
In 2021, the Times of India reported that Manav Bharti had sold many fake degrees over few years to people who did not actually study at the university.  In Singapore, two holders of these diplomas were jailed for submitting false qualifications in their work pass applications, while 19 more were permanently banned from the country.

Private universities in India
Universities in Himachal Pradesh
Educational institutions established in 2009
2009 establishments in Himachal Pradesh
Education in Solan district